John the Baptist in the Wilderness is a painting by Geertgen tot Sint Jans.

History 
It is in the collection of the Gemäldegalerie.

It was a mediation aid for pilgrims.

Description 
John the Baptist is the focal point in the painting, with a lamb supporter, in a Garden of Eden setting.

References 

1490s paintings
Paintings by Geertgen tot Sint Jans
Religious art
Collections of the Gemäldegalerie Alte Meister